The Cape Government Railways 3rd Class 4-4-0 of 1883 was a South African steam locomotive from the pre-Union era in the Cape of Good Hope.

In 1882, the Cape Government Railways placed orders with Neilson and Company for eighteen 3rd Class tender locomotives with a 4-4-0 American type wheel arrangement. They were intended for fast passenger service on all three Cape Systems and were delivered early in 1883.

Manufacturer
Eighteen 4-4-0 American type tender passenger locomotives were delivered to the Cape Government Railways (CGR) from Neilson and Company in 1883. They were numbered in the ranges from W77 to W88 for the Western System, E15 and E16 for the Eastern System and M80 to M83 for the Midland system. They had been ordered in 1882 for passenger service out of Cape Town, East London and Port Elizabeth respectively and were equipped with six-wheeled tenders.

Characteristics
The locomotive's slide valves were arranged above the inclined cylinders and were actuated by Joy valve gear, which had been invented in 1879 by David Joy, the Locomotive Superintendent of the Oxford, Dorchester and Wolverhampton Railway. Joy valve gear did not make use of eccentrics like the Stephenson Link valve gear which had hitherto been used and which, at times, proved to be troublesome.

The Roscoe-type lubricator to lubricate the cylinders was affixed on top of the smokebox to the rear of the chimney, since this position was convenient for obtaining a good connection with the main steam pipes. 

The locomotives were equipped with Adams' Vortex blast pipes. These had an outer annular orifice for steam and an inner circular opening for exhaust gases and formed the upper portion of a bell-mouth scoop. The lower portion of the scoop was open towards the bottom rows of tubes so that the draught though them was increased. The vortex blast pipes were, however, removed after a few years since it was found to choke up more readily than an ordinary blast pipe.

Service
The locomotives became known as the Four-coupled Joys, from the Joy valve gear that they were equipped with. One of the locomotives is known to have been named Sir Hercules, after Hercules Robinson, 1st Baron Rosmead, who had succeeded Sir Henry Bartle Frere as High Commissioner for Southern Africa in 1880 and after whom two towns in South Africa were named. The named engine was no. 83, which was either the Midland System's no. M83 or the Western System's no. W83. All these locomotives were later designated 3rd Class when a locomotive classification system was introduced by the CGR.

Cape Government Railways
As was usual practice with passenger locomotives on the CGR, the engines were painted green and had polished brass domes. In service, the Joy valve gear proved unsatisfactory and three of the Western System's locomotives were later converted to Stephenson valve gear at the CGR's Salt River shops in Cape Town. Even though this improved their performance, the modification was not carried out on any of the other locomotives.

At the time the Four-coupled Joy locomotives entered service in 1883, the Eastern System mainline from East London was open as far as Queenstown with a branch to King William's Town, the two Midland System main­lines from Port Eliza­beth were respectively open to Graaff Reinet and approaching Rosmead via Cradock with a branch to Grahamstown, while the Western System mainline from Cape Town was approaching De Aar with a branch to Malmesbury.

All these locomotives were renumbered at times during the CGR era. By 1886, the system prefixes had been done away with. The locomotives on the Western System retained their numbers, while the Midland System's locomotives were renumbered to the range from 180 to 183. The Eastern System's two locomotives were renumbered from E15 and E16 to 610 and 611 respectively. By 1888, after the three systems had been linked up at De Aar on 31 March 1884, the Midland System's locomotives were renumbered once again, to the range from 89 to 92, following on from the numbers of the Western System's locomotives.

Oranje-Vrijstaat Gouwerment-Spoorwegen
In late 1896, some of these locomotives were sold to the Oranje-Vrijstaat Gouwerment-Spoorwegen, where they retained their classification as 3rd Class. The sale most probably involved the five locomotives whose numbers were absent from the CGR roster for the first time by year-end 1896, as listed in the table. These engines were later fitted with the Tilney-design extended type of smokebox with spark arresters.

South African Railways
When the Union of South Africa was established on 31 May 1910, the three Colonial government railways (CGR, Natal Government Railways and Central South African Railways) were united under a single administration to control and administer the railways, ports and harbours of the Union. Although the South African Railways and Harbours came into existence in 1910, the actual classification and renumbering of all the rolling stock of the three constituent railways was only implemented with effect from 1 January 1912.

By 1912, only one of these locomotives survived, the Eastern System's no. 611. It was considered obsolete by the SAR, designated Class 03 and renumbered to 0611. By 1918, it had been scrapped.

Works numbers
The works numbers, original numbers and renumbering of the Cape 3rd Class of 1883 are listed in the table.

Illustration

References

0260
4-4-0 locomotives
2′B n2 locomotives
Neilson locomotives
Cape gauge railway locomotives
Railway locomotives introduced in 1883
1883 in South Africa
Scrapped locomotives